The Wreck of the B.S.M. Pandora is a science fiction board game published by Simulations Publications, Inc. (SPI) in 1980.

Description
The B.S.M. Pandora, a biological survey mission space ship in the distant future, has crash-landed on a planet during its mission to collect alien life forms. The crew faces two dangers: if the ship systems fail, they will die; and the dangerous alien life forms they had been transporting have escaped and are now roaming the ship. In this cooperative game, 1–5 players act as crew members trying to find tools to repair the spacecraft before the systems fail, as well as searching for weapons to kill or recapture the escaped aliens.

Components
The game comes with:
 11" x 17" paper map of the ship
 100 die-cut counters
 rulesheet
The boxed set also contains two 6-sided dice.

Publication history
SPI published The Wreck of the B.S.M. Pandora in the May 1980 edition of Ares (Issue 2), a game designed by Jim Dunnigan, with artwork by Joe Barney and Redmond A. Simonsen. The game was also released as a boxed set. 

Seven months later, SPI published a prequel game, Voyage of the B.S.M. Pandora, in the January 1981 edition of Ares (Issue 6), to explain how the ship had collected the aliens before it crashed. A boxed version of it was also released.

Reception
Craig Barber reviewed The Wreck of the B.S.M. Pandora in The Space Gamer No. 31. Barber commented that "For solitaire gamers, WOTP is a good game choice. The game plays best with very few crew members running around. I would recommend this as a good one-person game."

Other reviews
Moves #51 (June/July 1980)

References

Board games introduced in 1980
Cooperative board games
Simulations Publications games